CRX may refer to:

 Crossair (former ICAO airline designator: CRX), a Swiss airline
 CRX (band), an American band originating from Los Angeles, California formed as the side-project of The Strokes guitarist, Nick Valensi
 CRX (gene), a human gene that plays a role in the differentiation of photoreceptor cells 
 Crunchyroll Expo, an American anime convention
 Honda CR-X, a Japanese sports car
 Roscoe Turner Airport (IATA airport code: CRX), an airport in the US state of Mississippi.